{{Infobox Australian road
| type        = Motorway
| road_name   = Pacific Motorway
| state       = qld
| state2      = nsw
| image       = Southeast freeway.jpg
| caption     = 
| length      = 158
| direction_a = North
| direction_b = South
| end_a       =  Inner City Bypass
| end_b       =  Pacific Highway
| est         = 
| through     = 
| route       = 
| former      = 
| exits       =   Gateway Motorway Logan Motorway Gold Coast Highwayfor full list see exits.
| show_links  = yes
}}

The Pacific Motorway is a motorway in Australia between Brisbane, Queensland, and Brunswick Heads, New South Wales, through the New South Wales–Queensland border at Tweed Heads.

The motorway starts at Coronation Drive at Milton in Brisbane, The Brisbane city section of the motorway is often referred to by its former name, the Riverside Expressway. The motorway passes through the major tourist region of the Gold Coast, the destination for most of the vehicular traffic from Brisbane. More than A$2 billion was spent on the motorway between 1990 and 1998, including widening the road and safety measures.

The motorway passes Gold Coast attractions such as Warner Bros. Movie World, Wet'n'Wild Water World, and Dreamworld, which are among the most popular theme parks in Australia.  Since 2008 the motorway connects with the Tweed Heads bypass in New South Wales.

There are also plans to progressively widen the four lane section from Nerang to Tugun to six lanes. The first section of this upgrade (Nerang to Varsity Lakes) was completed in May 2012. Planning is ongoing for the remaining section of the upgrade (Varsity Lakes to Tugun).

History

Queensland section
The first section, opened in Brisbane in November 1972, was originally known as the Southeast Freeway'''. It included the Riverside Expressway which was designed to alleviate traffic congestion in central Brisbane.  The Southeast Freeway was connected to the Pacific Highway at Springwood in 1985.  The Southeast Freeway was designated originally as the F3, but this nomenclature was removed in 1994.

On 15 April 1996 it was announced that the Pacific Highway between the intersection with the Logan Motorway and Nerang would be upgraded to motorway standard. The upgraded road was opened to the public in October 2000.

In March 2006, the Queensland Government released planning for substantial changes to the section between Springwood and Daisy Hill, mainly at the entrances and exits along the section to deal with substantial traffic problems on surrounding streets and traffic backups onto the motorway. The planned upgrade led to some popular protest, mainly by people whose homes would be resumed for the project. Construction of the upgrade commenced in November 2009 and was completed in November 2012.

The Tugun Bypass was completed in 2008. It has four lanes (two in each direction in 2008 and provision for six lane widening in the future). Widening from four lanes to six lanes is planned for 2025.

Below is an overview of when each construction project on the highway (later motorway) was completed (from earliest to latest):

 1960 - Gaven Way. New road connecting Pacific Highway to Nerang, essentially forming the first stage of the Gold Coast bypass route, opened to traffic on 10 December 1960.
 1961 - Gold Coast Highway interchange. Grade-separated interchange at Gaven Way.
 1963 - Oakey Creek duplication.  of highway widened to four lanes at Oakey Creek.
 1965 - Halfway Creek to Bridge Creek duplication.   of new pavement opened to traffic by the end of June 1965.
 1965 - Beenleigh bypass. First carriageway of the Beenleigh bypass opened to traffic in December 1965, followed by the second carriageway in December 1966.
 1965–1966 - Coomera deviation.  Highway realigned to replace an old railway bridge with very windy approaches.  As the railway had closed in 1964, the new alignment did not need a bridge.  Aerial photos show it was open by 1967.
 1967 - Ormeau duplication.  Highway duplicated from Goldmine Road to Mirambeena Drive including a short deviation  between the two ends of Reedmans Road.  Total construction spanned .  The old highway is now Tillyroen Road.
 1968 - Logan River bridge duplication.  Second bridge across the Logan River opened as part of the duplication of the Pacific Highway.
 1970 - Pimpama Deviation.   of new road constructed to four lane standard.
 1971 - Coomera River bridge duplication. Second bridge across the Coomera River officially opened by Minister for Main Roads Ron Camm on 3 June 1971, completing four lanes between Brisbane and Helensvale.
 1971 - Oxenford Deviation.  of new road constructed to four lane standard.
 1973 - Alice Street to Juliette Street. First stage of the South-East Freeway, including the Captain Cook Bridge, officially opened to traffic on 7 March 1973.
 1976 - Riverside Expressway. New expressway between Hale Street and Alice Street, mostly constructed on bridges, officially opened on 22 July 1976.
 1976 - Nerang to Reedy Creek. Reconstructed and realigned highway along the former rail reserve completed in December 1976.
 1977 - Slacks Creek deviation.  Northbound carriageway realigned onto a straighter alignment paralleling the southbound carriageway.  Village Drive intersection (which provided access to Loganlea Road) was also upgraded.
 1977 - Juliette Street to Marshall Road. Second stage of the South-East Freeway opened between Juliette Street and Marshall Road on 27 July 1977.
 1979 - Nerang bypass. two-lane bypass of Nerang officially opened by Minister for Main Roads Russ Hinze on 6 April 1979.
 1980 - Marshall Road to Klumpp Road. Third stage of the South-East Freeway between Marshall Road and Klumpp Road officially opened on 21 October 1980.
 1981 - Loganlea Road Overpass.  New interchange built at Loganlea Road to replace the Village Drive intersection, which was closed after the overpass opened.
 1982 - Klumpp Road to Logan Road. Fourth stage of the South-East Freeway opened between Klumpp Road and Logan Road by Queensland Premier Sir Joh Bjelke-Petersen on 13 August 1982.
 1983 - Bryants Road interchange.  Interchange opened at Bryants Road, eliminating the previous at-grade intersection.
 1984 - Oxenford Interchanges.  Two new interchanges opened at Hope Island Road and Helensvale Road.  One interesting part of this project was the extra off-ramp built directly to The Ox Tavern.  The person behind this was most likely Minister for Main Roads Russ Hinze, who would later become very well known for his corruption.
 1985 - Reedy Creek to Tugun Extension. Two-lane bypass of West Burleigh opened to traffic in three stages; West Burleigh to Palm Beach in October 1981, Reedy Creek to West Burleigh in November 1983, and Palm Beach to Tugun on 17 May 1985.
 1985 - Helensvale to Nerang duplication. Four-lane duplication works completed between Gold Coast Highway and Nerang River in June 1985.
 1985 - Tweed Heads bypass. Two-lane bypass opened by Minister for Main Roads and Racing Russ Hinze on 18 July 1985 at a total cost of A$3.6m; second carriageway completed in December 1986.
 1985 - Logan Road to Compton Road. Fifth and final stage of the South-East Freeway officially opened by Minister for Main Roads and Racing Russ Hinze on 22 November 1985.
 1986 - Logan River bridge duplication. New concrete bridge across Logan River, duplicating the 1968 bridge, officially opened by Minister for Main Roads and Racing Russ Hinze on 16 July 1986.
 1987 - Mudgeeraba Interchange. Half-diamond interchange at Mudgeeraba Road opened by Minister for Main Roads and Racing Russ Hinze on 21 August 1987.
 1987 - Coomera Interchange. Interchange opened by Deputy Premier and Minister for Main Roads Bill Gunn on 10 December 1987.  Much like the later interchanges at Ormeau, it had a very short life of only 12 years.
 1987 - Smith Street Motorway.  New motorway connection road opened to connect Southport to Gaven.  A new interchange was built with the Pacific Highway as part of the project.  The opening date was May 20.
 1988 - Worongary Interchange. Half-diamond interchange opened by Deputy Premier and Minister for Main Roads Bill Gunn on 27 July 1988.
 1988 - Chatswood Interchange Stage 1.  This stage involved construction of the Paradise Road roundabout, service roads and northbound on and off-ramps.
 1989 - Reedy Creek Interchange. Interchange completed in September 1989.
 1989 - Chatswood Interchange Stage 2.  Chatswood Road linked to Paradise Road roundabout via a new access road under the highway.  Over 30 years later the interchange is still in use.
 1990 - Computer Road Interchange.  This interchange only lasted 9 years, being replaced by the current one in 1999.
 1991 - Peachey Road Interchange.  This one did not last long either, also being replaced in 1999.
 1991 - Nerang to Mudgeeraba Duplication. Duplication to four lanes between Pappas Way and Mudgeeraba Road and a new interchange at Elysium Drive opened by Federal Minister for Transport Bob Brown on 23 December 1991.
 1992 - Helensvale Interchange. Upgraded interchange at Gold Coast Highway opened by Federal Minister for Transport Bob Brown on 29 October 1992.
 1993 - Mirambeena Drive Interchange.  Like the two interchanges north of it, it was also replaced in 1999.
 1993 - Rochedale Road to Watland Street six-laning. 
 1994 - Mudgeeraba to Reedy Creek duplication. Duplication to four lanes between Mudgeeraba Road and Reedy Creek Road and a new overpass at Reedy Creek Road opened by Minister for Transport David Hamill on 18 May 1994.
 1994 - Yawalpah Interchange. Diamond interchange at Yawalpah Road opened by MP Paul Braddy on 3 November 1994.  Unlike the other interchanges in the area, this one survived the late 90s upgrades and is still in use today.  In June 2019, plans to redesign the interchange were announced.  A detailed design has been released, but as of February 2022 construction is yet to begin.
 1995 - Gateway Motorway to Sports Drive and Watland Street to Winnetts Road six-laning.
 1996 - Winnetts Road to Beenleigh-Redland Bay Road six-laning. Widening to six lanes and a new interchange at Beenleigh-Redland Bay Road completed in December 1996.
 1997 - Reedy Creek to Tugun duplication. Duplication to four lanes between Reedy Creek Road and Stewart Road and a southerly extension of Bermuda Street to the highway opened by Minister for Main Roads Vaughan Johnson on 16 June 1997.
 2000 - Loganholme to Nerang Upgrade (Pacific Motorway Upgrade). -long eight-lane upgrade of the Pacific Motorway between Loganholme and Gaven, and six lanes including various interchange and service centre upgrades as well as heralding Queensland's first alphanumeric route number, M1, officially commissioned by Premier Peter Beattie and Minister for Main Roads Steve Bredhauer on 6 October 2000 at a completed cost of A$850m.
 June 2008 - Tugun Bypass. Features a tunnel. Crosses the state border.
 2012 - Nerang to Worongary Upgrade. Six-lane widening works between Pappas Way and Gooding Drive completed on 25 May 2012.
 2014 - Worongary to Mudgeeraba Upgrade. Six-lane widening works between Gooding Drive and Robina Town Centre Drive completed on 26 September 2014.
 2016 - Coomera interchange upgrade. Roundabouts have been replaced by signalised intersections.
 May 2020 - M1/M3 Gateway Merge upgrade. Widening to five southbound lanes. A new busway on-ramp.
 June 2020 - Mudgeeraba to Varsity Lakes Upgrade. Widening to six lanes with smart technologies.
 September 2021 - Sports Drive to Gateway Motorway Upgrade. Widening to five northbound lanes between Sports Drive and Gateway Motorway. The upgrade was done on 7 September 2021.
 June 2022 - Eight Mile Plains to Daisy Hill Upgrade.

Queensland Upgrade Projects

New South Wales section

It was renamed to Pacific Motorway from Pacific Highway in February 2013.

The motorway's first stage was completed in July 1985 with the opening of the first stage of the Tweed Heads Bypass, followed by the second stage in November 1992. Over the next 20 years, sections of the motorway progressively opened to traffic, until the final section, the Banora Point upgrade, opened in September 2012. For more comprehensive information on this section of motorway, see the Ozroads website.

Below is an overview of when each stage of the motorway was completed (from south to north):

Service centres

The Pacific Motorway, when it was upgraded in September 2000, was the first motorway in Queensland to have service centres integrated. There are two service centres, Stapylton servicing southbound traffic, and Coomera servicing northbound traffic. The travel centres include fuel and fast-food restaurants, picnic areas and a shop. Solar panels on the roofs of the centres provide power to the facilities.

Speed limits

Speed cameras
There is a fixed speed camera on the Pacific Motorway at Tarragindi, facing northbound. There is another at Loganholme just after the Logan Motorway exit facing northbound. A third set of speed cameras, situated on the northbound side of the motorway at the Smith Street overpass at Gaven, became active around March 2013.

Major settlements

Gold Coast
Yatala to Coolangatta is within the City of Gold Coast.  The city has a population of 500,000 and is Australia's sixth-largest city.  The oceanside parts of the Gold Coast are characterised by high-rises, residential canal developments, a casino, theme parks, amusement parks and numerous tourist attractions, whilst its inland suburbs are leafy and well kept, looking much like the newer suburbia of other large Australian cities. The Gold Coast attracts tourists from around the world and is one of Australia's leading tourist destinations. Most of the city is bypassed by the Pacific Motorway (M1 Motorway) which continues from Metroad 3 at Logan City south of Brisbane. The former route of the Pacific Highway through the Gold Coast has been renamed as the Gold Coast Highway. The Gold Coast Highway was very congested until the Tugun Bypass opened in June 2008 bypassing a badly traffic snarled section near the Gold Coast Airport.

Tweed Heads
The highway crosses the Tweed River south of Banora Point. Tweed Heads is the major commercial centre of the southern part of the Gold Coast, which extends as far south as Chinderah in New South Wales.  It was known as a "twin town" along with Coolangatta, Queensland before they coalesced with other towns to form the suburbia of the Gold Coast.  The Tweed River valley contains the Cudgen Road Tunnel completed in 2002. The tunnel was built to avoid the visual impact of a road cutting.

Interchanges

New South Wales

Queensland

Notes

See also

 Freeways in Australia
 Freeways in New South Wales
 Freeways in Brisbane
 Freeways in Gold Coast
 M1, Queensland

References

External links
 

Highways in Australia
Highways in Queensland
Roads in Brisbane
Roads on the Gold Coast, Queensland
Logan City
Highway 1 (Australia)
Borders of New South Wales